Vincent Wan Yeung-ming (born 2 February 1958 in Macau) is a Hong Kong actor.

Filmography
 Find Your Voice (2017)
 Shock Wave (2017)
 Guia in Love (2015)
 Imprisoned: Survival Guide for Rich and Prodigal (2015)
 IPCC Files 2015 (2015) (TV series)
 Tales from the Dark 2 (2013)
 The Stool Pigeon (2010)
 Confession of Pain (2006) - Uncle Man
 Isabella (2006) - Bik-Yan's father
 Infernal Affairs III (2003) - Night club manager
 Payment in Blood (2001)
 Healing Hearts (2001) - Officer Chen
 The Young Ones (2001) - Officer Cheung
 Sex Medusa (2001)
 Those Were the Days... (2000) - Hon Ben
 Black Cat in Jail (2000)
 The Flying Fox of Snowy Mountain (1999) (TV series) - Miu Yan-fung
 Metade Fumaca (1999)
 The Storm Riders (1998) - Summit Yu
 Portland Street Blues (1998) - Ben Hon
 Young and Dangerous 5 (1998) - Ben Hon
 Chinese Midnight Express (1998) - Wan Chi-Hoe
 Walk In (1997) - Lo Bill
 Young and Dangerous 4 (1997) - Ben Hon
 Love Is Not a Game, But a Joke (1997)
 Ebola Syndrome (1996) - Yeung
 The Eighth (1996) - Ming
 Midnight Express in Orient (1996) - David Chiang
 To Be No. 1 (1996) - Seven
 Ghostly Bus (1995) - Bus Driver
 Legendary Couple (1995) - Lui Chan Sam
 S.D.U. - Mission in Mission (1994) - Chung-Bing
 The Other Side of the Sea (1994) - Sau's boyfriend
 How Deep Is Your Love (1994) - King of Curry
 Fatal Obsession (1994) - Frankie
 The Tragic Fantasy - Tiger of Wanchai (1994) - Hung
 Lover of the Swindler (1993) - Michael/Dr. Wong's partner
 Don't Stop My Crazy Love for You (1993) - Chiu
 Love Among the Triad (1993) - Tong Chun
 Shanghai Heroic Story (1992) - Lok Chi-Hing
 Call Girl '92 (1992) - Ah Man
  (1992 TV series) - Fong Yau Wai
 Rich Man (1992) - Boss Ming
 Prison on Fire II (1991) - Fai Chi
 Fist of Fury 1991 (1991) - Cheng Wai
 Powerful Four (1991) - Sam
 Touch and Go (1991) - Pitt
 Rebel from China (1990) - Ming
 All for the Winner (1990) - Billy
 Wild Search (1989) - Cop

References

External links
 
 HK cinemagic entry
 loveHKfilm entry

Hong Kong male actors
Living people
1958 births